The Louis Bull Tribe is a First Nations band government in Alberta, Canada. One of the "four nations" of Maskwacis, it controls one Indian reserve, Louis Bull 138B, and shares ownership of another, Pigeon Lake 138A.

References

First Nations governments in Alberta
Cree governments